Goksan Yeon clan is one of the Korean clans. Their Bon-gwan is in Koksan County, North Hwanghae Province. According to the research held in 2015, the number of the Goksan Yeon clan was 33891. Yeon clan originated from Nanyang Commandery (around present-day Nanyang, Henan), China. Their founder was  who served as Menxia Shilang and general officer in Goryeo.  was from Hongnong Commandery (south of present-day Lingbao City, Henan). Yeon Su chang, 7th descendant of  became a  subordinate of Princess Jeguk who was forced to marry ordinary person by Chungnyeol of Goryeo and was settled in Koksan County. Then, he founded Goksan Yeon clan because he was appointed as Count of Koksan.

The clan gained notoriety for producing several Korean independence activists during the Japanese colonial era. Yeon Byung-hwan (ko), his younger brother Yeon Byung-ho (ko) and daughter Yeon Mi-dang (ko) were associates of more high-profile figures such as Kim Gu and Ahn Changho and aided their anti-Japanese activities.

See also 
 Korean clan names of foreign origin

References

External links 
 

 
Yeon clans
Korean clan names of Chinese origin